Germany participated in the Eurovision Song Contest 2006 with the song "No No Never" written by Jane Comerford. The song was performed by Texas Lightning. The German entry for the 2006 contest in Athens, Greece, was selected through the national final Der deutsche Vorentscheid 2006 – 50 Jahre Grand Prix, organised by the German broadcaster ARD in collaboration with Norddeutscher Rundfunk (NDR). The national final took place on 9 March 2006 and featured three competing acts with the winner being selected through public voting. "No No Never" performed by Texas Lightning was selected as the German entry for Athens after gaining 46% of the vote.

As a member of the "Big Four", Germany automatically qualified to compete in the final of the Eurovision Song Contest. Performing in position 8, Germany placed fourteenth out of the 24 participating countries with 36 points.

Background 

Germany has won the contest on one occasion: in 1982 with the song "Ein bißchen Frieden" performed by Nicole. Germany, to this point, has been noted for having competed in the contest more than any other country; they have competed in every contest since the first edition in 1956 except for the 1996 contest when the nation was eliminated in a pre-contest elimination round. In 2005, the German entry "Run & Hide" performed by Gracia placed last out of twenty-four competing songs scoring four points.

The German national broadcaster, ARD, broadcasts the event within Germany and delegates the selection of the nation's entry to the regional broadcaster Norddeutscher Rundfunk (NDR). NDR confirmed that Germany would participate in the 2006 Eurovision Song Contest on 22 May 2005. Since 1996, NDR had set up national finals with several artists to choose both the song and performer to compete at Eurovision for Germany. On 29 November 2005, the broadcaster had announced that they would organise a multi-artist national final to select the German entry.

Before Eurovision

Der deutsche Vorentscheid 2006 – 50 Jahre Grand Prix 
Der deutsche Vorentscheid 2006 – 50 Jahre Grand Prix (English: The German Preliminary Decision 2006 – 50 Years of the Grand Prix) was the competition that selected Germany's entry for the Eurovision Song Contest 2006. The competition took place on 9 March 2006 at the Schauspielhaus in Hamburg, hosted by Thomas Hermanns. Three acts competed during the show with the winner being selected through a public televote. The show was broadcast on Das Erste as well as online via the broadcaster's Eurovision Song Contest website eurovision.de. The national final was watched by 5.28 million viewers in Germany.

Competing entries 
Three acts were selected by an expert panel consisting of representatives of the entertainment department for NDR. Two of the participating acts were announced on 13 December 2005 and the third act was announced on 15 December 2005. Among the competing acts was the winner of the Eurovision Song Contest 1972 Vicky Leandros.

Final 
The televised final took place on 9 March 2006. The winner, "No No Never" performed by Texas Lightning, was selected solely through public voting, including options for landline and SMS voting. During the final, an expert panel commented on the performances. The members of the expert panel were Dirk Bach (actor, comedian and television presenter), Georg Uecker (actor), Lucy Diakovska (singer) and Joy Fleming (1975 German Eurovision entrant). In addition to the performances of the competing entries, former German Eurovision entrants Mary Roos (1972), Ingrid Peters (1986), Michelle (2001), Corinna May (2002) and Lou (2003) as well as former winners of the Eurovision Song Contest Brotherhood of Man (1976), Dana International (1998) and the Olsen Brothers (2000) performed their respective entries. 794,957 votes were cast in the final: 618,076 via landline and 176,881 via SMS.

At Eurovision
According to Eurovision rules, all nations with the exceptions of the host country and the "Big Four" (France, Germany, Spain and the United Kingdom) are required to qualify from the semi-final in order to compete for the final; the top ten countries from the semi-final progress to the final. As a member of the "Big 4", Germany automatically qualified to compete in the final on 20 May 2006. In addition to their participation in the final, Germany is also required to broadcast and vote in the semi-final. The running order for the final in addition to the semi-final was decided through an allocation draw, and Germany was subsequently drawn to perform in position eight, following Malta and preceding Denmark. At the conclusion of the final, Germany placed fourteenth in the final, scoring 36 points.

In Germany, the two shows were broadcast on Das Erste which featured commentary by Peter Urban, as well as on Deutschlandfunk and NDR 2 which featured commentary by Thomas Mohr. The German spokesperson, who announced the top 12-point score awarded by the German televote during the final, was Thomas Hermanns.

Voting 
Below is a breakdown of points awarded to Germany and awarded by Germany in the semi-final and grand final of the contest, and the breakdown of the voting conducted during the two shows. Germany awarded its 12 points to Finland in the semi-final and to Turkey in the grand final of the contest.

Points awarded to Germany

Points awarded by Germany

References

2006
Countries in the Eurovision Song Contest 2006
Eurovision
Eurovision